Daphne jasminea is a shrub, of the family Thymelaeaceae.  It is native to Greece.

Description
The shrub is evergreen and grows up to 0.2 meters tall. Its flowers are white and pale pink and is often found on limestone rocks.

References

jasminea